The 1928 United States presidential election in Colorado took place on November 6, 1928, as part of the 1928 United States presidential election which was held throughout all contemporary forty-eight states. Voters chose six representatives, or electors to the Electoral College, who voted for president and vice president.

Although Colorado had been strongly Democratic-leaning between 1896 and 1916, the nomination of Catholic New York Governor Smith was very poorly received in the eastern part of the state, part of the High Plains Methodist “Bible Belt”. The state had been all but ruled by the Ku Klux Klan for a number of years early in the decade, and the strong anti-Catholic sentiment remained outside the heavily Mexican-American south-central part of the state. Although Smith did make large gains in the Mexican-American counties, Hoover gained greatly over Calvin Coolidge in 1924 by up to 30 percent in the heavily populated Front Range counties and Colorado consequently became the seventh most Republican state in the nation, voting 14 percentage points more Republican than the nation at-large.

Hoover’s is the best Republican presidential performance in Colorado’s history, and the second-best by any candidate behind William Jennings Bryan in 1896 when he was overwhelmingly supported by the state’s powerful silver mining industry.

Full results

Results by county

References

Colorado
1928
1928 Colorado elections